Cubans are people identified with Cuba or people with Cuban citizenship. Cuba is a multi-ethnic nation, home to people of different ethnic, religious and national backgrounds.

Racial and ethnic groups

Census
The population of Cuba was 11,167,325 inhabitants in 2012.
The largest urban populations of Cubans in Cuba (2012) are to be found in Havana (2,106,146), Santiago de Cuba (506,037), Holguín (346,195), Camagüey (323,309), Santa Clara (240,543) and Guantánamo (228,436). 
According to Cuba's Oficina Nacional de Estadisticas ONE 2012 Census, the population was 11,167,325 including: 5,570,825 men and 5,596,500 women.

Source.

European

In the 2012 Census of Cuba, 64.1% of the inhabitants self-identified as white. Based on genetic testing (2014) in Cuba, the average European, African and Native American ancestry in those auto-reporting to be white were 86%, 6.7%, and 7.8%. The majority of the European ancestry comes from Spain. During the 18th, 19th and early part of the 20th century especially, large waves of Asturians, Canary Islanders, Galicians and Catalans emigrated from Spain to Cuba. Other European nationalities with significant influx include: English, French, Germans, Irish, Italians, Poles and Scots. Europeans with lesser influx were Greeks, Portuguese, Romanians and Russians. Central and Eastern European influence was mostly during the Cold War years and immigration from the British Isles was mostly to Havana and Pinar del Rio Province. There is also a small European Jewish community.

Sub-Saharan African

The Afro-Cuban population was 9.3% in the 2012 Census of Cuba. Just about 1.3 million Cubans described themselves as black. Thus a significant proportion of those living on the island affirm some sub-Saharan African ancestry. The matter is further complicated by the fact that a fair number of people still locate their origins in specific African ethnic groups or regions, particularly the Akan, Yoruba (or Lucumí), Igbo and Congo, but also Arará, Carabalí, Mandingo, Fula, Makua, and others.
Based on genetic testing in 2014, the average African, European and Native American ancestry in those self-reporting to be "negro (Black)" was 65.5% "African", 29% "European" ancestry and 5.5% "Native American" or other ancestry.

Although Afro-Cubans can be found throughout Cuba, Eastern Cuba has a higher concentration of Blacks than other parts of the island, and Havana has the largest population of blacks of any city in Cuba.

In Cuba, there is an Afro-Gypsy population.

Multiracial

In the 2012 Census of Cuba, 26.6% (2.97 million) of the Cubans self-identified as mulatto or mestizo.

Prior to the 20th century, majority of the Cuban population was of mixed race descent to varying degrees, with pure Spaniards or criollos being a significant minority. Between 1902 and 1933, some 750,000 Spaniards migrated to Cuba from Europe, which changed the racial demographics of the region rapidly. Many of the newly arrived Spanish migrants did not intermix with the native Cuban population, unlike the earlier colonial settlers and conquistadors who intermixed with Tainos and Africans at large scale rates. Self identified “white” Cubans with colonial roots on the island usually have Amerindian and or African admixture to varying degrees, as well as self identified “black” Cubans with colonial roots having varying degrees of European and or Amerindian admixture.

East Asian

Officially called amarilla (yellow in English) in the Cuban census, Cubans of East Asian origins made up 1.02% of the population in the 2002 Census of Cuba. They are primarily made up of Chinese descendants who came as indentured laborers in the 19th century to build railroads and work in mines. Historically, Chinese descendants in Cuba were once classified as "white". After the Industrial Revolution, many of these laborers stayed in Cuba because they could not afford return passage to China.

Amerindian
Of the Taínos the number of people claiming descent have not been formally recorded. Most, however, live on the eastern part of the island, notably in Granma, Guantánamo, and Las Tunas. The intermixing between European settlers and the native Taíno was prevalent in the early colonial era and left behind an undercounted amount of descendants. According to a 2018 genome-wide data study, the eastern region of the island had an average Native American ancestry contribution of 10% as compared to an average of 5% in the rest of the island.

Additionally, many North American Indians living in Spanish missions in Georgia and Florida were evacuated to Spanish Cuba along with the fleeing Spanish settlers following the loss of Spanish Florida. As a result, descendants of the Calusa, Tequesta, Timucua and other now-extinct indigenous peoples of Florida are now assimilated into the mainstream Cuban population, comprising part of Cuba's Amerindian genetic makeup.

Intermarriage between diverse groups is so general as to be the rule.

Population changes
Cuba's birth rate (9.88 births per thousand population in 2006) is one of the lowest in the Western Hemisphere. Its overall population has increased continuously from around 7 million in 1961 to over 11 million now, but the rate of increase has stopped in the last few decades, and has recently turned to a decrease, with the Cuban government in 2006 reporting the first drop in the population since the Mariel boatlift. Immigration and emigration have had noticeable effects on the demographic profile of Cuba during the 20th century. Between 1900 and 1930, close to a million Spaniards arrived from Spain.

Since 1959, over a million Cubans have left the island, primarily to Miami, Florida, where a vocal, well-educated and economically successful exile community exists (Cuban-American lobby).

Genetics

An autosomal study from 2014 found the genetic ancestry in Cuba to be 72% European, 20% African and 8% Amerindian. This study was of Cubans in Cuba, not the Cuban exile community in United States or other parts of the world, who may have different genetic profiles. Of note, there is high variability between regions within Cuba, with individuals from Western provinces having higher European ancestry on average, and those in the Eastern region having more African and Native American genetic contribution. Cuban genealogy has become a rising interest for Cubans in the last 15 years.

A 1995 study done on the population of Pinar del Río, found that 50% of the Mt-DNA lineages (female lineages) could be traced back to Europeans, 46% to Africans and 3% to Americans. This figure is consistent with both the historical background of the region, and the current demographics of it. According to another study in 2008, regarding the geographical origin attributed to each mtDNA haplogroup, 55% of the sequences found in Cubans are of West Eurasian origin (namely, Europe and the Middle East) and 45% of African origin
Regarding Y-chromosome haplogroups (male lineages), 78.8% of the sequences found in Cubans are of West Eurasian origin, 19.7% of African origin and 1.5% of East Asian origin. Among the West Eurasian fraction, the vast majority of individuals belong to West European haplogroup R1b. The African lineages found in Cubans have a Western (haplogroups E1, E2, E1b1a ) and Northern (E1b1b-M81 ) African origin. The North African haplogroup E1b1b1b (E-M81), is found at a frequency of 6.1%.

According to Fregel et al. (2009), the fact that autochthonous male E-M81 and female U6 lineages from the Canaries have been detected in Cuba and Iberoamerica, demonstrates that Canary Islanders with indigenous Guanche ancestors actively participated in the American colonization.

Cubans abroad

The United States has the largest number of Cubans outside Cuba. As of 2019, the United States Census Bureau's American Community Survey showed a total population of 1,359,990 Cubans. As of 2015, 68% of Cuban-born residents of the United States have naturalized automatically losing their Cuban citizenship. Significant populations of Cubans exist in the cities of Hialeah and Miami in Florida (995,439 Cubans in this state in 2017) and in Texas (60,381), New Jersey (44,974), California (35,364), New York (26,875), and Illinois (22,541)  

The second largest Cuban diaspora is in Spain. As of 2019, there were 151,423 Cubans in Spain. Smaller numbers of Cubans live in Uruguay, Italy*, Mexico*, and Canada.

After the founding of the republic in 1902, a considerable migration (over 1 million) arrived from the Iberian peninsula to the island, between them were more than a few former Spanish soldiers who participated in the wars, and yet it never created an obstacle for the respect and affection of Cubans, who have always been proud of their origins.
In December 2008, Spain began accepting citizenship applications from the descendants of people who went into exile after its brutal 1936-39 Civil War, part of a 2007 law meant to address the painful legacy of the conflict. This new Historical Memory Law has granted to more than 140,000 Cubans of Spanish ancestry the Spanish citizenship, and there were 143,048 Cubans with Spanish citizenship in Cuba and 93,004 in Spain on January 1, 2019. Under the law, the descendants had until December 2011 to present themselves at the Spanish embassy in their home country and turn in documentation that proves their parents or grandparents fled Spain between 1936 and 1955. They did not need to relinquish their current citizenship.

History

The first people known to have inhabited Cuba was the Siboney, an Amerindian people. They were followed by another Amerindian people, the Taíno who were the main population both of Cuba and other islands in The Antilles when Christopher Columbus first sighted the island in 1492. He claimed the islands for Spain and Cuba became a Spanish colony. It was to remain so until 1902 apart from a brief occupation by Britain in 1762, before being returned in exchange for Florida. Towards the end of the 19th century, Spain had lost most of its American possessions and a series of rebellions had shaken Cuba. This, combined with calls for annexation of Cuba in the United States, led to the Spanish–American War, and in 1902 Cuba gained formal independence.

During the first decades of the 20th century, USA interests were dominant and in Cuba, leading to large influence over the island. This ended in 1959 when de facto leader Fulgencio Batista was ousted by revolutionaries led by Fidel Castro. Quickly deteriorating relations with the US led to Cuba's alliance with the Soviet Union and Castro's transformation of Cuba into a declared socialist republic. Cuban soldiers were sent overseas to fight in the Angolan Civil War and Ogaden War in the 1970s-1980s. Castro remained in power until 2008, first as Prime Minister then from 1976 as President of Cuba. Fidel was succeeded by his brother Raúl Castro.Miguel Díaz-Canel succeeds the brothers Fidel and Raúl Castro, making him the first non-Castro leader of Cuba since the revolution in 2018.Miguel Mario Díaz-Canel y Bermúdez (Spanish: [mi.ˈɣel ˈdi.as kaˈnel]; born 20 April 1960) is a politician and engineer who is the third first secretary of the Communist Party of Cuba.

Culture and traditions

The culture of Cuba reflects the island's influences from various cultures, primarily European 
(Spanish),Taino and African.

One of the most distinctive parts of Cuban culture is Cuban music and dancing, being well-known far outside the country. Well known Hispanic music styles such as mambo, salsa, rumba, cha-cha-chá, bolero, and son originated in Cuba. The origins of much of Cuban music can be found in the mix of Spanish and West African music, while American musical elements such as trombones and big band were also significant elements in the formation of Cuban music. Cuban literature includes some of the most well-known names of the islands, such as writer and independence hero José Martí in the late 19th century. More contemporary Cuban authors include Daína Chaviano, Pedro Juan Gutiérrez, Antonio Orlando Rodríguez, Zoé Valdés and Leonardo Padura Fuentes.

The Spanish language is spoken by virtually all Cubans on the island itself. Cuban Spanish is characterized by the reduction of several consonants, a feature that it shares with other dialects of Caribbean Spanish as well as the Canary Islands. Many Cuban-Americans, while remaining fluent in Spanish, use American English as one of their daily languages.

Religion

Cuba's prevailing religion is Roman Catholicism, although in some instances it is profoundly modified and influenced through syncretism. A common syncretic religion is Santería, which combined the Yoruba religion of the African slaves with some Catholicism; it shows similarities to Brazilian Umbanda and has been receiving a degree of official support.

The Roman Catholic Church estimates that 60 percent of the population is Catholic, with 10 percent attending mass regularly, while independent sources estimate that as few 1.5 percent of Catholics do so.

Membership in Protestant churches is estimated to be 5 percent and includes Baptists, Pentecostals, Seventh-day Adventists, Presbyterians, Episcopal Church of Cuba|Episcopalians, Methodists, Religious Society of Friends (Quakers), and Lutherans. Other groups include the Greek Orthodox Church, the Russian Orthodox Church, Jehovah's Witnesses, Hindus, Muslims, Buddhists, Jews, Baháʼís, and the Church of Jesus Christ of Latter-day Saints (Mormons).

Cuba is home to a variety of syncretic religions of largely African cultural origin. According to a US State Department report, some sources estimate that as much as 80 percent of the population consults with practitioners of religions with West African roots, such as Santeria or Yoruba. Santería developed out of the traditions of the Yoruba, one of the African peoples who were imported to Cuba during the 16th through 19th centuries to work on the sugar plantations. Santería blends elements of Christianity and West African beliefs and as such made it possible for the slaves to retain their traditional beliefs while appearing to practice Catholicism. La Virgen de la Caridad del Cobre (Our Lady Of Charity) is the Catholic patroness of Cuba, and is greatly revered by the Cuban people and seen as a symbol of Cuba. In Santería, she has been syncretized with the goddess Ochún. The important religious festival "La Virgen de la Caridad del Cobre" is celebrated by Cubans annually on 8 September. Other religions practised are Palo Monte, and Abakuá, which have large parts of their liturgy in African languages.

Influence of the Canary Islands 

Many words in traditional Cuban Spanish can be traced to those of the Spanish spoken in the Canary Islands. Many Canary Islanders emigrated to Cuba and had one of the largest parts in the formation of the Cuban dialect and accent. There are also many elements from other areas of Spain such as Andalusian, Galician, Asturian, Catalan, as well as some African influence. Cuban Spanish is very close to Canarian Spanish. Canarian emigration has been going on for centuries to Cuba, and were also very numerous in emigration of the 19th, and 20th centuries.

Through cross emigration of Canarians and Cubans, many of the customs of Canarians have become Cuban traditions and vice versa.
The music of Cuba has become part of the Canarian culture as well, such as mambo, salsa, son, and punto Cubano. Because of Cuban emigration to the Canary Islands, the dish "moros y cristianos" (black beans and rice mixed together with traditional spices, different from "frijoles negros", which is a thick black bean soup served over white rice), also known as simply "moros", can be found as one of the foods of the Canary Islands; especially the island of La Palma. Canary Islanders were the driving force in the cigar industry in Cuba, and were called "Vegueros". Many of the big cigar factories in Cuba were owned by Canary Islanders. After the Castro revolution, many Cubans and returning Canarians settled in the Canary islands, among them were many cigar factory owners such as the Garcia family. The cigar business made its way to the Canary Islands from Cuba, and now the Canary Islands are one of the places that are known for cigars alongside Cuba, Dominican Republic, Nicaragua, and Honduras. The island of La Palma has the greatest Cuban influence out of all seven islands. Also, La Palma has the closest Canarian accent to the Cuban accent, due to the most Cuban emigration to that island.

Many of the typical Cuban replacements for standard Spanish vocabulary stem from Canarian lexicon. For example, guagua (bus) differs from standard Spanish autobús the former originated in the Canaries and is an onomatopoeia stemming from the sound of a Klaxon horn (wah-wah!). The term of endearment "socio" is from the Canary Islands. An example of Canarian usage for a Spanish word is the verb fajarse ("to fight"). In standard Spanish the verb would be pelearse, while fajar exists as a non-reflexive verb related to the hemming of a skirt. Cuban Spanish shows strong heritage to the Spanish of the Canary Islands.

Many names for food items come from the Canary Islands as well. The Cuban sauce mojo, is based on the mojos of the Canary Islands where the mojo was invented. Also, Canarian ropa vieja is the father to Cuban ropa vieja through Canarian emigration. Gofio is a Canarian food also known by Cubans, along with many other kinds.

Symbols

The flag of Cuba is red, white, and blue; and was first adopted by Narciso López on a suggestion by the poet Miguel Teurbe Tolón. The design incorporates three blue stripes, representing the three provinces of the time (Oriente, Centro, and Occidente), and two white stripes symbolizing the purity of the patriotic cause. The red triangle stands for the blood shed to free the nation. The white star in the triangle stands for independence.

See also

Cuban nationality law
Afro-Hispanic
Cuban Americans
Cuban British
Cuban exile
Cuban Spanish
Cubans in Italy
Cuba-United States relations
History of Cuban Nationality
Hispanics
List of Cubans
List of Cuban Americans
Spanish American
White Hispanic
Taíno
Cuban migration to Miami
Cuban immigration to the United States
Cuban Mexicans
Cuban cuisine

References

 
Ethnic groups in the Caribbean